Albioun Fernando Summer (November 2, 1921 – November 19, 1981) was an American politician who served as the Attorney General of Mississippi from 1969 to 1980.

He died of a heart attack on November 19, 1981, in Jackson, Mississippi at age 60.

References

1921 births
1981 deaths
Mississippi Attorneys General
Mississippi Democrats